Tales From The Acoustic Planet, Vol. 3: Africa Sessions is an album by banjoist Béla Fleck. Nicknamed "Throw Down Your Heart" after one of the songs, the album is actually a soundtrack for a film of the same name, released by Docurama Films, which he produced, about travelling through Africa, recording with many musicians from that continent as he searched for the origins of the banjo.

The DVD was released by Docurama on November 3, 2009, while the Blu-ray will be released by Shout! Factory in the future. It will also be aired on Palladia in the future as well.

Track listing
 "Tulinesangala" (Traditional), with Nakisenyi Women's Group from Uganda.
 "Kinetsa" (Randrianasolo), with D'Gary from Madagascar.
 "Ah Ndiya" (Sangare), with Oumou Sangare from Mali.
 "Kabibi" (Nogoglia), with Anania Ngoglia from Tanzania.
 "Angelina" (Traditional), with Luo Cultural Association from Uganda.
 "D'Gary Jam" (Fleck, Radrianasolo), with musicians from Madagascar, Uganda, Mali, Senegal, South Africa, Tanzania, and Cameroon.
 "Throw Down Your Heart" (Fleck), with Haruna Samake Trio and Bassekou Kouyate from Mali.
 "Thula Mama" (Mahlasela), with Vusi Mahlasela from South Africa.
 "Wairenziante" (Muwewesu), with Muwewesu Xylophone Group from Uganda.
 "Buribalal" (Bocoum), with Afel Bocoum from Mali.
 "Zawose" (Traditional), with Chibite/The Zawose Family from Tanzania.
 "Ajula/Mabamba" (Traditional), with The Jatta Family from the Gambia.
 "Pakugyenda Balebauo" (Chacha), with Warema Masiaga Cha Cha from Tanzania.
 "Jesus is the Only Answer" (Ateso Jazz band), with Ateso Jazz Band from Uganda.
 "Matitu" (Traditional), with Khalifan Matitu from Tanzania.
 "Mariam" (Fleck, Tounkara), with Djelimady Tounkara from Mali.
 "Djorolen" (Sangare), with Oumou Sangare from Mali.
 "Dunia Haina Wema/Thumb Fun" (Fleck, Ngolig), with Anania Ngoliga from Tanzania.

References 

Béla Fleck albums
2009 albums
Rounder Records albums